Dezq (also known as Daraq) is a village in Sarvelayat Rural District, Sarvelayat District, Nishapur County, Razavi Khorasan Province, Iran. At the 2006 census, its population was 467, in 154 families.

References 

Populated places in Nishapur County